John Cornelius may refer to:

 John Cornelius (priest) (1557–1594), English Catholic priest, Jesuit and martyr
 John Cornelius (MP) (died 1567), English politician
 John Cornelius (pirate), Irish pirate